Szymon Romać (born 1 October 1992) is a Polish professional volleyball player, a bronze medallist at the 2015 European League, and the 2018 Polish Champion. At the professional club level, he plays for LUK Lublin.

Honours

Clubs
 National championships
 2017/2018  Polish SuperCup, with PGE Skra Bełchatów
 2017/2018  Polish Championship, with PGE Skra Bełchatów

References

External links
 
 Player profile at PlusLiga.pl 
 Player profile at Volleybox.net

1992 births
Living people
People from Lubin
Polish men's volleyball players
European Games competitors for Poland
Volleyball players at the 2015 European Games
Polish expatriate sportspeople in France
Expatriate volleyball players in France
Cuprum Lubin players
Trefl Gdańsk players
Skra Bełchatów players
LKPS Lublin players
Opposite hitters